The Ciutat de Barcelona Tennis Tournament is a defunct tennis tournament for male professional players that was considered one of the best challengers on the ATP Tour. The event was held annually in Barcelona, Catalonia, from 1993 to 2006 on clay courts.

Past finals

Singles

Doubles

See also
List of tennis tournaments

Tennis tournaments in Catalonia
Defunct tennis tournaments in Spain
Clay court tennis tournaments
ATP Challenger Tour
Recurring sporting events established in 1993
Recurring events disestablished in 2006
Tennis tournaments in Barcelona